The 1941–42 Panhellenic Championship did not occur due the events of the WW2 and the Axis occupation of Greece. The Union of Greek Athletes was substantially re-established in 1942, with track and field athletes on the front line. Fundraising, food, healthcare and monitoring were their main activities. The needy, the suffering, but also the tuberculosis sufferers who left their last breath in the bloody beds of "Sotiria", saw a helping hand from the UoGA. Nevertheless, its role enlarged in the second half of 1942 when football joined in. The 1941–42 season was the one with the least sports activity during the years of The Occupation. Its known for sure that 2 friendly games were organized. One was between Olympiacos and Ethnikos Piraeus with a result of 4–0 in favor of the former, in which Nikos Godas also scored, who was the most emblematic figure of a football player in the vortex of the events of the time. The second would not be held, but it would be remembered for the protest that started during and afterwards the cancelation of the match.

The friendly that turned into a demonstration
In the spring of 1942, the Union of Greek Athletes had arranged that Panathinaikos and AEK Athens would play a friendly game at the German-ordered Leoforos Alexandras Stadium, which had already acquired headlights from the United States, something pioneering for the time. About 15,500 spectators showed up, with the players having arranged most of the proceeds to go to the needs of Hospital "Sotiria". However, the conquerors could not leave such an influx of people uncontrollable and appointed an Austrian referee, who aimed to control what was happening. Also, the Greeks were not allowed to take part of the proceeds, with the result that both teams decided not to compete.

The story of the leader of AEK Athens, Kleanthis Maropoulos, was typical: "We decided to hold this game on the one hand to massify the Union of Greek Athletes and on the other hand to strengthen with the proceeds our tuberculosis athletes who were melting in the Hospital "Sotiria". The people, who had been watching football for years, filled the stadium on the Avenue. More than 15,000 were inside the stadium, and many were left out. Both teams would play with full lineups. Shortly before the match, as we had agreed, we formed a committee of footballers and went to the office of Apostolos Nikolaidis, the president of Panathinaikos. In the committee were Kritikos from Panathinaikos, Tzanetis and I. We asked Nikolaidis to give us a part of the proceeds, to support tuberculosis. He replied that he was not prepared to do such a thing and even announced that the referee in the match would be an Austrian, an officer of the Axis forces. After that answer, we decided not to play. If we did, it would be like agreeing with the conquerors. We both went out on the field together, greeted the fans, and instead of starting the match, we went up to the stands and started explaining to the people exactly what had happened. People accepted our explanations. What followed we could not imagine. Outraged, the fans rushed to the field and literally left nothing standing. The wooden platforms were removed, the beams were uprooted, slogans in favor of the footballers and against Apostolos Nikolaidis and the Panathinaikos administration were heard. The incidents spread and an anti-fascist demonstration quickly formed, which reached as far as Omonia. The demonstrators were dispersed only with the appearance of the German Occupation forces…".

References

External links
Rsssf, 1941-42 championship

1941–42 in Greek football
Panhellenic Championship seasons
Greece
Athens in World War II